Gostaresh Foulad Tabriz Football Club (Bashgah-e Futbal-e Gâsteresh Fulâd Tebriz) was an Iranian football club based in Tabriz, Iran. The club was founded in 2008. They were promoted to Persian Gulf Pro League in the 2012–13 season. The club was owned by Mohammad Reza Zonuzi, an Iranian businessman and economist and was one of the few privately owned clubs in Iran's premier league. In 2018, the club's ownership was moved to Amir Hossein Alagheband and the club moved to Urmia. 
 
Gostaresh Foolad also had a futsal team in the senior, under 22's, under 19's, under 17's, and under 15's levels.

History

Establishment
Formed in 2008, Gostaresh took over the licence of Niroye Zamini when they ran into financial difficulties. Gostaresh had played the previous season in Iran Football's 3rd Division, placing first overall.

Azadegan League
While providing limited results in the club's inaugural season in the Azadegan League, Gostaresh found success in the Hazfi Cup.

The team reached the finals by securing a 2–0 victory over Persian Gulf Pro League side Zob Ahan The victory sealed Gostaresh a meeting with Asian powerhouse Persepolis in the  Hazfi Cup final. Clearly outmatched, Gostaresh lost the home leg 1–0 from a goal by Persepolis forward Sheys Rezaei, who scored in the 12th minute. In the second leg at Azadi Stadium in Tehran, gostaresh lost 3–1 for a total aggregate loss of 4 goals to 1, giving Persepolis the Hazfi Cup.

In the 2011–2012 season Luka Bonacic took over the club's managerial role, at the end of the year Gostaresh was tied for second place and a shot at promotion, but goal difference dropped them to third, and hopes of promotion were destroyed on the final day.

The 2012–2013 season saw the introduction of Rasoul Khatibi, his tactics seemed to work and Gostaresh easily clinched automatic promotion to the Iran Pro League

Persian Gulf Pro League
Gostaresh Foolad play in the 2013–14 Iran Pro League season. They lost in the round of 16 of the Hazfi Cup to Azadegan League side Sanat Naft Abadan. In their first year in the league, Gostaresh had a decent season, finishing 10th.

After a bad start to the 2014–15 season Mehdi Tartar was fired as head coach of the club and replaced by Faraz Kamalvand who saved Gostaresh from relegation, finishing in 11th place.

Under Faraz Kamalvand Gostaresh had one of their best ever seasons in the 2015–16 season, finishing in ninth place. In the summer of 2016, Gostaresh signaled their big ambitions to Iranian football with several big purchases. Namely Brazilian goalkeeper Fernando de Jesus from champions Esteghlal Khuzestan and former national team player Mohammadreza Khalatbari. The club finished a best ever 8th place in the 2016–17 season. However shortly after, Faraz Kamalvand resigned and signed with Sanat Naft Abadan.

Stadium
Bonyan Diesel Stadium is Gostaresh Foolad's main stadium with the capacity of 12,000. The stadium and its complex includes two grass pitches. The club aim's to get an A rating from the Asian Football Confederation regarding their stadium. Starting in the 2014–15 season the club will play its home games at Bonyan Diesel Stadium.

The stadium is expandable and it expanded can host a final capacity of 20,000.

Kit
Since the club's establishment in 2008, the teams has worn an all blue home kit with an all white away kit, corresponding with the club's logo. From 2008 to 2014, Gostaresh's kit sponsor was German company Uhlsport who also supplied the Iran national football team and a large number of other Iranian clubs. Starting in the summer of 2014, the club switched to Spanish company Kelme. After only one season with Kelme, Gostaresh once again switched sponsors and chose Iranian based company Merooj.

Season-by-season

The table below chronicles the achievements of Gostaresh Foolad F.C. in various competitions since 2009.

International friendlies
Since its establishment Gostaresh has played a number of European friendlies. Their biggest result came on 3 July 2016 after defeating Turkish runners up Fenerbahçe.

Head coaches

Achievements
Hazfi Cup
Runners-up (1): 2009–10

Azadegan League
Winner (1): 2012–13

League 3
Winner (1): 2008–09

Persian Gulf Pro League
Fair play Team of the Year: 2014–15

Unofficial titles
 MDS Cup:
Winners (1): 2016

Asian clubs ranking
.

See also
 Gostaresh Foolad Tabriz FSC

References

External links
Official website (archived) 

Football clubs in Iran
Association football clubs established in 2008
Sport in Tabriz